Maiolati Spontini is a comune (municipality) in the Province of Ancona in the Italian region Marche, located about  southwest of Ancona. It is the birthplace of musician Gaspare Spontini, whose name has been conjoined with the commune's ancient name, Maiolati.

Maiolati Spontini borders the following municipalities: Belvedere Ostrense, Castelbellino, Castelplanio, Cupramontana, Jesi, Monte Roberto, Rosora, San Marcello.

References

Cities and towns in the Marche